This is a list of senior officers of the Finnish Defence Forces since Finland's independence from Russian in 1917/18.

Chiefs of Defence  

 General Carl Gustaf Emil Mannerheim 1918
 Major-General Karl Fredrik Wilkman 1918
 Major-General Vilhelm Aleksander Thesleff 1918
 Colonel Karl Rudolf Walden 1918
 Major-General Karl Fredrik Wilkman 1919
 Major-General Kaarlo Edward Kivekäs 1919
 Major-General Karl Fredrik Wilkama 1919–1924
 Lieutenant General Vilho Petter Nenonen 1924–1925
 Colonel Lauri Malmberg 1925
 Lieutenant General Karl Fredrik Wilkama 1925–1926
 Lieutenant General Aarne Sihvo 22 May 1926 – 13 January 1933
 Lieutenant General Hugo Viktor Österman 1933–1939
 Marshal Carl Gustaf Emil Mannerheim 1939–1944
 General Axel Erik Heinrichs 1944–1945
 Lieutenant General Jarl Frithiof Lundqvist 1945–1946
 General Aarne Sihvo 1946–1953
 General Kaarlo Aleksander Heiskanen 1953–1959
 General Jaakko Sakari Simelius 1959–1965
 General Yrjö Ilmari Keinonen 1965–1969
 General Kaarlo Olavi Leinonen 1969–1974
 General Lauri Sutela 1974–1983
 General Jaakko Valtanen 1983–1990
 Admiral Jan Klenberg 1990–1994
 General Gustav Hägglund 1994–2001
 Admiral Juhani Kaskeala 2001–2009
 General Ari Puheloinen 2009–2014
 General Jarmo Lindberg 2014–2019
 General Timo Kivinen 2019–

Other 
 General Adolf Ehrnrooth 1905–2004

References 

Finnish generals